Cape Chidley is a headland located on the eastern shore of Killiniq Island, Canada, at the northeastern tip of the Labrador Peninsula.

Cape Chidley was named by English explorer John Davis on August 1, 1587, after his friend and fellow explorer John Chidley. On October 22, 1943, the  landed just south of Cape Chidley and set up Weather Station Kurt to collect data about the weather.

In the original plans for the Pinetree Line (a series of radar stations along the 50th parallel north), Cape Chidley was meant to be the site for a long-range radar station called "N-30." Supplies were moved to the site by ship during 1951–52, but in late 1952–early 1953 the site was moved to Resolution Island.

Location

Sometimes spelled Cape Chudleigh, Cape Chidley is located on the short boundary between the province of Newfoundland and Labrador and the territory of Nunavut on Killniq Island. It forms the northernmost point of Labrador.

The Dominion of Newfoundland, having been a separate country at the time that Canada's Arctic islands were assigned in this manner, shared a boundary with the Dominion of Canada on Killiniq Island. The territory of Labrador included the entire Atlantic watershed of the Labrador Peninsula and its islands. 

The northern and western part of Killiniq Island (under Nunavut's jurisdiction) drains into Ungava Bay and the Hudson Strait. Thus Cape Chidley is also the terminus of the Laurentian Divide, which separates the Arctic Ocean watershed from the Atlantic Ocean watershed. (Some sources include Hudson Bay in the Atlantic Ocean watershed, though the Laurentian Divide has been long established and places Hudson Bay with the Arctic Ocean watershed.) The cape marks the south end of the entrance to the Hudson Strait, opposite Resolution Island.

The closest community to Cape Chidley was Port Burwell, Nunavut, until it was evacuated in 1978. Killiniq Island itself is separated from mainland North America by the narrow McLelan Strait.

The Torngat Mountains run along the coast of Labrador and terminate at Killiniq Island.

The Cape Chidley Islands lie at the north end of the cape.

References

Further reading

 Atlantic Geoscience Society, and Geological Association of Canada. From Cape Chidley to Cape Race: Exciting New Developments in Mineral and Petroleum Exploration. AGS, 1996.
The Pinetree Line. https://web.archive.org/web/20090621062335/http://www.pinetreeline.org/ 2002

External links 
Pictures of Cape Chidley

Chidley
Chidley
Borders of Newfoundland and Labrador
Borders of Nunavut